Four-time defending champion Richard Sears defeated Godfrey M. Brinley in the challenge round, 6–3, 4–6, 6–0, 6–3 to win the men's singles tennis title at the 1885 U.S. National Championships. It was Sears' fifth title at the U.S. championships.

Draw

Challenge round

Finals

Earlier rounds

Section 1

Section 2

References 

 

Men's singles
1885